Quartz diorite is an igneous, plutonic (intrusive) rock, of felsic composition, with phaneritic texture. Feldspar is present as plagioclase (typically oligoclase or andesine) with 10% or less potassium feldspar. Quartz is present at between 5 and 20% of the rock. Biotite, amphiboles and pyroxenes are common dark accessory minerals.

References

Definition with images

Plutonic rocks

ja:閃緑岩#石英閃緑岩